This timeline lists events in the external environment that have influenced events in human history. This timeline is for use with the article on environmental determinism.  
For the history of humanity's influence on the environment, and humanity's perspective on this influence, see timeline of history of environmentalism.  
See List of periods and events in climate history for a timeline list focused on climate.

Pre-Holocene (1.5 Mya)
The time from roughly 15,000 to 5,000 BC was a time of transition, and swift and extensive environmental change, as the planet was moving from an Ice age, towards an interstadial (warm period). Sea levels rose dramatically (and are continuing to do so), land that was depressed by glaciers began lifting up again, forests and deserts expanded, and the climate gradually became more modern. In the process of warming up, the planet saw several "cold snaps" and "warm snaps", such as the Older Dryas and the Holocene climatic optimum, as well as heavier precipitation. In addition, the Pleistocene megafauna became extinct due to environmental and evolutionary pressures from the changing climate. This marked the end of the Quaternary extinction event, which was continued into the modern era by humans. The time around 11,700 years ago (9700 BC) is widely considered to be the end of the old age (Pleistocene, Paleolithic, Stone Age, Wisconsin Ice Age), and the beginning of the modern world as we know it.

10th millennium BC

9th millennium BC

8th millennium BC

7th millennium BC

6th millennium BC

5th millennium BC

4th millennium BC

3rd millennium BC

2nd millennium BC

1st millennium BC

1st millennium AD

1st century

2nd century

3rd century

4th century

5th century

6th century

7th century

8th century

9th century

10th century

2nd millennium

11th century

12th century

13th century

14th century

15th century

16th century

17th century

18th century

19th century

20th century

3rd millennium

21st century

See also

 Behavioral modernity
 Chronology of the universe 
 Civilization
 Cradle of civilization
 Culture
 History of life
 Formation and evolution of the Solar System
 Geologic time scale
 Global temperature record
 Graphical timeline from Big Bang to Heat Death
 Graphical timeline of the universe
 History of Earth
 Human evolution
 Human evolutionary genetics
 Human history
 Kardashev scale
 Paleoclimatology
 Paleotempestology
 Recorded history
 Snowball Earth
 Technological singularity
 Timeline of human evolution
 Timeline of the evolutionary history of life
 World history

References

External links
Timeline of European Environmental History
Environmental History Timeline

 
History, Environmental
Environment